Andrew Mate was a Hungarian-American soccer midfielder who spent most of his career in the German American Soccer League.  He also played a season in the Bundesliga, one in the National Professional Soccer League and one in the North American Soccer League.  He earned one cap with the U.S. national team in 1964.  He died in his native Hungary on May 13, 2012 at the age of 72.

Professional career
Mate spent most of his career with New York Hungaria of the German American Soccer League.  In 1962, Mate won both the league and National Challenge Cup with Hungaria. Mate scored two of Hungaria's three goals in the win over the San Francisco Scots.  In 1963 he scored all five goals in Hungaria's first round aggregate defeat of Mexico's Deportivo Oro in the CONCACAF Champions' Cup.  In 1964-65, he was in and out of the team with Hamburger SV in Germany where most sources referred to him as "Andreas" Mate (the Hungarian version would be Andras). In 1967, Mate played a single season with the New York Generals of the National Professional Soccer League.  When the New York Cosmos entered the North American Soccer League in 1971, it drew much of its initial roster from the GASL.  As a result, Mate played the Cosmos first season.  In 1975, he played for the New Jersey Americans of the American Soccer League.

National team
Mate earned one cap with the U.S. national team in a 10-0 loss to England on May 27, 1964.

References

External links
 NASL stats

1942 births
2012 deaths
Footballers from Budapest
American soccer players
American Soccer League (1933–1983) players
American expatriate sportspeople in West Germany
German-American Soccer League players
Hungarian emigrants to the United States
National Professional Soccer League (1967) players
New York Cosmos players
New York Generals (NPSL) players
New Jersey Americans (ASL) players
North American Soccer League (1968–1984) players
Philadelphia Spartans players
United States men's international soccer players
Association football midfielders
Hamburger SV players
Bundesliga players
Expatriate footballers in West Germany
American expatriate soccer players
Hungarian footballers